Karl "Charles" Kessler (January 11, 1911 – April 10, 1998) was a Swiss ice hockey player who competed for the Swiss national team at the 1936 Winter Olympics in Garmisch-Partenkirchen.

Personal life
His brother, Herbert Kessler, also competed as a member of the national team at the 1936 Games.

References

1911 births
1998 deaths
Ice hockey players at the 1936 Winter Olympics
Olympic ice hockey players of Switzerland